TeamQuest Corporation is a computer software company specializing in Systems management, Performance management and Capacity planning software for computer servers. TeamQuest is headquartered in Eden Prairie, Minnesota. In 2016, shortly after lay-offs "due to a decline in the company's software development for mainframe structures", the company was acquired by HelpSystems.

History 
TeamQuest was founded in 1991 by three employees from a software research and development group at Unisys Corporation.

Solutions 
TeamQuest solutions are focused on IT Service Optimization (ITSO). The stated goal of ITSO is to "meet IT service levels while minimizing infrastructure costs and mitigating risks", for example through server consolidation.

TeamQuest released a comprehensive update to its Vityl suite of infrastructure monitoring and capacity management tools in January 2017.

Customers 
TeamQuest customers include companies across a variety of industries.

See also 
BigAdmin Feature Article: Using TeamQuest Performance Software to Monitor Zones for Performance Management of the Solaris OS
Business Profile on Yahoo Finance : Teamquest Corporation

References

Software companies based in Iowa
System administration
Computer systems
American companies established in 1991
1991 establishments in the United States
Defunct software companies of the United States